Arenal Botanical Gardens are on the eastern shore of Lake Arenal in northwest Costa Rica, 2 kilometers north of the village of Unión, Guanacaste. Opened in 1991, the facility hosts hundreds of tropical plants and flowers as well as a hummingbird sanctuary and butterfly garden.

In recent years, the gardens have fallen into disrepair; they are now in poor condition.

References

Botanical gardens in Costa Rica
Protected areas established in 1991
Lake Arenal
Geography of Guanacaste Province
Tourist attractions in Guanacaste Province
1991 establishments in Costa Rica